Agra catbellae is a species of carabid beetle named after the actress Catherine Bell. The holotype was collected in Costa Rica and first described to science in 2002.

Etymology 
Terry L. Erwin, who described the species, explained that the binomial nomenclature is catbellae because it is the "combined name of the actress starring on the then-current TV program JAG, Catherine Bell. These beetles share the forest with an elegant cat, the Jaguar".

Other species in the genus Agra named by Erwin include Agra liv, named after Liv Tyler, and Agra schwarzeneggeri, named after Arnold Schwarzenegger.

See also 
 List of organisms named after famous people (born 1950–present)

References 

Lebiinae
Beetles described in 2002